Seth Air is the fifth album by American jazz trumpeter Wallace Roney which was recorded in 1991 and released on the Muse label.

Reception

The AllMusic review by Scott Yanow stated, "Trumpeter Wallace Roney, 32 at the time of this recording, has yet to escape from the shadow of Miles Davis. However he is one of the stronger brassmen in jazz of the 1990s and plays quite well on this set ... The music is straightahead but occasionally as unpredictable as the repertoire".

Track listing
All compositions by Antoine Roney except where noted
 "Melchizedek" − 7:30
 "A Breath of Seth Air" − 6:58
 "Black People Suffering" − 6:35
 "28, Rue Pigalle" − 5:47
 "Lost" (Jacky Terrasson) − 3:48
 "People" (Jule Styne, Bob Merrill) − 8:26	
 "Gone" (George Gershwin, Ira Gershwin, DuBose Heyward) − 6:28
 "Wives and Lovers" (Burt Bacharach, Hal David) − 6:47

Personnel 
Wallace Roney − trumpet
Antoine Roney − tenor saxophone 
Jacky Terrasson − piano 
Peter Washington − bass 
Eric Allen − drums

References 

1991 albums
Wallace Roney albums
Albums recorded at Van Gelder Studio
Muse Records albums